Uchinoura may refer to:
Uchinoura, Kagoshima, a former town in Japan, now part of Kimotsuki.
Uchinoura Space Center, Japan's rocket launch facility close to Uchinoura.